Luigi Bartolini (8 February 1892 – 16 May 1963) was an Italian painter, writer, and poet. He is known for his novel, Bicycle Thieves, upon which the Italian neorealist film directed by Vittorio De Sica and of the same title was based. He published over 70 books during his lifetime. His work was also part of the painting event in the art competition at the 1948 Summer Olympics.

Exhibitions and awards 

 1928 - First participation in the Venice Biennale
 1932 - Italian engraving exhibition - 1st Prize
 1935 - 1st Rome Quadrienniale - 1st Prize for engraving
 1939 - 2nd Rome Quadrienniale - 1st Prize for engraving
 1942 - XXII Venice Biennale - Personal room and 1st prize for engraving
 1950 - Lugano International Award - 1st prize
 1951 - Solo exhibition at the Silvagni gallery in Paris
 1952 - Personal exhibition at the National Chalcography in Rome
 1952 - XXVI Venice Biennale - Engraving Award
 1953 - Personal exhibition in Brussels at the Royal Library
 1953 - Chianciano Prize for poetry with the book "Pianete"
 1954 - Marzotto Prize for literature with D. Buzzati
 1956 - Marzotto prize for painting
 1956 - III Bienniale of Engraving in Venice - Prize of the Presidency of the Council
 1960 - He was appointed Academician of San Luca
 1962 - XXXI Venice Biennale - Personal room
 1962 - Personal exhibition at the National Chalcography in Rome
 1965 - IX Rome Quadrienniale - Personal room

Works

Novels 

1930 – Passeggiata con la ragazza – Ed. Vallecchi- Firenze
1930 – Il ritorno sul Carso – Ed. Mondadori- Milano
1931 – Il molino della carne – Ed. Bompiani- Milano
1933 – L'orso ed altri amorosi capitoli – Ed. Vallecchi- Firenze
1940 – Follonica ed altri 14 capitoli di umore amoroso – Ed. Emiliano degli Orfini- Genova
1942 – Il cane scontento ed altri racconti – Ed. Tuminelli- Roma
1943 – Vita di Anna Stikler racconti e acqueforti – Ed. Tuminelli- Roma
1946 – Ladri di biciclette – Ed. Polin – Roma
1948 – Ladri di biciclette 2a edizione – Ed. Longanesi- Milano
1945 – Ragazza caduta in città – Ed. Il Solco- Città di Castello
1949 – Amata dopo – Ed. Nistri Lischi- Pisa
1951 – Il mezzano Alipio – Ed.Vallecchi- Firenze
1954 – Signora Malata di cuore – Vallecchi- Firenze
1955 – Antinoo o l'efebo dal naso a becco di civetta- Ed. Porfiri – Roma
1955 – Castelli Romani – Ed. Cappelli – Bologna
1957 – Tre prose d'arte – Il sodalizio del libro – Venezia
1959 – La pettegola ed altri racconti – Ed. Cappelli – BOlogna
1960 – Le acque del Basento – Ed. Mondadori – Milano
1960 – Passeggiata con la ragazza nuova edizione – Ed. Mondadori – Milano
1962 – L'antro di Capelvenere – Ed. Istituto d'arte – Urbino
1963 – Racconti scabrosi – Ed. Scheiwiller – Milano

Poetry

1924 – Il guanciale – Ed. Merat – Parigi
1924 – Il guanciale – Ed. IL pensiero contemporaneo – Torino
1931 – La vita dei morti – Ed. Campitelli – Foligno
1939 – Poesie 1928-1938 – Ed. La Modernissima – Roma
1941 – Poesie ad Anna Stikler – Ed. Il Cavallino – Venezia
1942 – Scritti d'eccezione – Ed. IL Campano – Pisa
1944 – Poesie e satire – Ed. D.O.C. – Roma
1948 – Liriche e polemiche – Ed- Nistri Lischi – Pisa
1953 – Pianete – Ed. Vallecchi – Firenze
1953 – Poesie per Anita e Luciana – Ed. Scheiwiller – Milano
1953 – Addio ai sogni – Ed. Scheiwiller – Milano
1953 – Ombre fa le metope – Ed. Schwarz – Milano
1954 – Dodici Poesie di Luigi Bartolini – Ed. Malaria – Follonica
1954 – Poesie 1954 – Ed. Vallecchi – Firenze
1958 – Al padre ed altri poemetti – Ed. Miano – Milano
1959 – Il Mazzetto – Ed. MOndadori – Milano
1960 – Poesie 1960 – Ed. Bucciarelli – Ancona
1961 – 13 Canzonette – Ed. Scheiwiller – Milano
1963 – L'eremo dei frati bianchi – Ed. Bucciarelli – Ancona
1963 – Testamento per Luciana – Ed. Bucciarelli – Ancona

See also 
 Verzocchi collection

References

External links 
 Sito dedicato a Luigi Bartolini a cura di Flavio Richiedei
 Scuola Romana
 
 The Luigi Bartolini Archive of the Palma-Desio Collection, edited by Dario Palma in collaboration with Luciana Bartolini

Italian male poets
1892 births
1963 deaths
Italian male novelists
20th-century Italian painters
20th-century Italian male artists
Italian male painters
20th-century Italian poets
20th-century Italian novelists
20th-century Italian male writers
Olympic competitors in art competitions
19th-century Italian male artists